The  is a Japanese railway line in Kagawa Prefecture, which connects Takamatsu-Chikkō Station in Takamatsu with Kotoden-Kotohira Station in Kotohira. It is owned and operated by the Takamatsu-Kotohira Electric Railroad. The line color is yellow.

Station list
All stations are located in Kagawa Prefecture.
* indicates staffed station.

History
The line first opened on 21 December 1926 between Ritsurin-Kōen and Takinomiya.

References

Rail transport in Kagawa Prefecture
Kotohira Line
Standard gauge railways in Japan